Sam Hansen, better known by his stage name PNC, is a New Zealand hip hop artist and rapper.
  
The name "PNC" is an acronym for Palmerston North City.

He attended Awatapu College.

PNC first gained underground notoriety performing alongside Breaking Wreckwordz. His unofficial single "Day in the Life" stayed at number one on the Bfm charts for three weeks. He followed that with appearances on P-Money's "321 Remix", "Get Back" and the NZ chart topping "Stop The Music" single from the Magic City album in 2004.

PNC later signed to P-Money's Dirty Records and released his first album, Rookie Card, in 2006. The first two singles, "Bomb!" and "Just Roll", were relatively successful songs in New Zealand. He followed with hit singles P-N-Whoa! and "Who Betta Than This" (which samples the song "3,2,1 Remix"). Rookie Card went on to win the best urban/hip-hop album at the 2007 Vodafone Music Awards in New Zealand.

PNC's second album, Bazooka Kid, was released on 2 June 2009, and his third album, Man On Wire, was released on 18 April 2011. In 2012, PNC supplied the entrance music, a flip of Drake’s The Motto called SBW Theme, for Sonny Bill Williams' fight against Clarence Tillman III. In 2017, PNC released new single Iverson 01, a tribute to Hall of Fame NBA shooting guard Allen Iverson’s MVP season in 2001, when he led the league in scoring and steals. He also mentions Tyronn Lue in the song, who was on the Lakers when Iverson led his Sixers to the NBA finals, and who got to go head-to-head with the Philadelphia guard in Game 1. Iverson put a stellar move on Lue, made his jumper, and stepped over a fallen Lue as he walked by the Lakers’ bench. This song, along with Sonny Bill 04, Jonah 95, and others, implies the meaning that PNC is at the top of his game. He released his latest single, Too Easy, in December 2017.

Discography

Albums
 Rookie Card (2006)
 Bazooka Kid (2009)
 Man On Wire (2011)
 Under the Influence (Mixtape) (2012)
 The Codes (2014)
 The Luke Vailima EP (2016)

Mixtapes
Ohhhh.....On the PNC Tip (2005)

Singles

Featured singles

Other guest appearances

References

New Zealand hip hop musicians
New Zealand people of Samoan descent
Year of birth missing (living people)
Living people
New Zealand rappers